Avicelase may refer to one of two enzymes:
Cellulase
Cellulose 1,4-beta-cellobiosidase